Ariosoma is a genus of marine congrid eels.

Species
Currently recognized species in this genus:
 Ariosoma anago (Temminck & Schlegel, 1846) (Silvery conger)
 Ariosoma anagoides (Bleeker, 1853) (Sea conger)
 Ariosoma anale (Poey, 1860) (Longtrunk conger) (syn. Ariosoma analis)
 Ariosoma balearicum (Delaroche, 1809) (Band-tooth conger) (syn. Ariosoma impressa, Ariosoma minor, Ariosoma somaliense)
 Ariosoma bauchotae Karrer, 1982
 Ariosoma coquettei D. G. Smith & Kanazawa, 1977
 Ariosoma dolichopterum Karmovskaya, 2015
 Ariosoma fasciatum (Günther, 1872) (Barred conger) (syn. Ariosoma nancyae)
 Ariosoma gilberti (J. D. Ogilby, 1898) (Gilbert's garden eel)
 Ariosoma howensis (McCulloch & Waite, 1916) (Lord Howe conger)
 Ariosoma kapala (Castle, 1990)
 Ariosoma major (Asano, 1958)
 Ariosoma marginatum (Vaillant & Sauvage, 1875) (Large-eye conger) (syn. Ariosoma bowersi)
 Ariosoma mauritianum (Pappenheim, 1914) (Blunt-tooth conger)
 Ariosoma meeki (D. S. Jordan & Snyder, 1900)
 Ariosoma megalops Fowler, 1938
 Ariosoma mellissii (Günther, 1870) (Silver eel)
 Ariosoma multivertebratum Karmovskaya, 2004
 Ariosoma nigrimanum Norman, 1939
 Ariosoma obud Herre, 1923
 Ariosoma ophidiophthalmus Karmovskaya, 1991
 Ariosoma opistophthalmum (Ranzani, 1839)
 Ariosoma prorigerum (C. H. Gilbert, 1891) (Slope conger) 
 Ariosoma sanzoi (D'Ancona, 1928)
 Ariosoma sazonovi Karmovskaya, 2004
 Ariosoma scheelei (Strömman, 1896) (Tropical conger)
 Ariosoma selenops Reid, 1934
 Ariosoma sereti Karmovskaya, 2004
 Ariosoma shiroanago (Asano, 1958)
 Ariosoma sokotranum Karmovskaya, 1991

Former Species
Species formerly categorized as Ariosoma, that are now listed under a different genus
 Ariosoma bleekeri (Fowler, 1934) - now known as Bathycongrus bleekeri
 Ariosoma guttulata (Günther, 1887) - now known as Bathycongrus guttulatus (lined conger)
 Ariosoma mystax (Delaroche, 1809) - now known as Gnathophis mystax (thinlip conger)

References

 
Congridae
Taxa named by William John Swainson
Fish described in 1838